The 1894 VAMC football team represented Virginia Agricultural and Mechanical College in the 1894 college football season. The team was led by their head coach Joseph Massie and finished with a record of four wins and one loss (4–1).

Schedule

Players

The following players were members of the 1894 football team according to the roster published in the 1895 and 1903 editions of The Bugle, the Virginia Tech yearbook.

Season summary

Emory and Henry
VAMC played their first game of the year on October 20, 1894 against Emory and Henry College at their new athletic field, Sheib Field, in front of 400 spectators. VAMC won the toss and scored their first touchdown three minutes into the game, with VAMC halfback Harvey running into the end zone, with R. N. Watts missing the extra point. Harvey two more touchdowns in the second half, with Watts converts both extra points. Due to injuries to the Emory squad, the second half was not completed and VAMC won the game.

Roanoke
On October 29, 1894, VAMC played its second game of the year, which was a win over Roanoke College, 36–0. The game was played in front of 500 spectators.

St. Albans (first game)
VAMC played St. Albans Boys Lutheran School on November 10, 1894 and won 42–0, which was then the most points scored against an opponent in Blacksburg. VAMC halfback Christopher Guignard recorded two eighty-yard runs during the game, who also scored three touchdowns. The other touchdowns were scored by T. D. Martin, N. R. Patrick, H. A. Johnson, and Harvey, with R. N. Watts converting seven extra points.

St. Albans (second game)
On November 17, 1894, VAMC played a second game against St. Albans in Radford, Virginia. The game was played in pouring rain and VAMC won 12–0, scoring a touchdown in both halves.

Virginia Military Institute

VAMC played against Virginia Military Institute in Staunton, Virginia on November 29, 1894. The two teams were led to the grounds by the Stonewall Brigade Band. VAMC recorded their only loss of the season, losing 6–10. VMI quarterback Sidney Foster scored on an eighty-yard touchdown run. One report reads "The Blacksburg team played brilliantly and had it not been for two rank decisions by the umpire and referee, the score would have been reversed."

References

VAMC
Virginia Tech Hokies football seasons
VAMC football